The 2021 Men's IHF/EHF Trophy took place in Tbilisi, Georgia from 14 to 19 June 2021 and was a replacement for the cancelled 2021 IHF Emerging Nations Championship. After the 2021 IHF Emerging Nations Championship was cancelled, the EHF announced in March 2021 that the IHF/EHF Trophy will be held. The three best teams qualified for the relegation round of the 2024 European Men's Handball Championship qualification.

Georgia defeated Cyprus in the final to win the tournament.

Preliminary round
All times are local (UTC+4).

Group A

Group B

Knockout stage

Bracket

Semifinals

Fifth place game

Third place game

Final

Final standings
{|class=wikitable style="text-align:center;"
! Rank !! width=180|Team
|-bgcolor=#CCFFCC
| || align=left| 
|-bgcolor=#CCFFCC
|  || align=left| 
|-bgcolor=#CCFFCC
|  || align=left| 
|-
| 4 || align=left| 
|-
| 5 || align=left| 
|}

All-Star team
The all-star team was announced on 19 June 2021.

Notes

References

External links
EHF Page

IHF/EHF Trophy
IHF/EHF Trophy
Sport in Tbilisi
IHF/EHF Trophy